Walenty Stefański (12 February 1813 in Śródka, Poznań County - 30 June 1877 in Pelplin) was a Polish bookseller, publisher, political activist and co-founder of the Polish League (Liga Polska). He supported autonomy for Greater Poland during the Greater Poland Uprising of 1848 against Kingdom of Prussia, and was a member of the Polish National Committee (1848).

Son of a fisherman, Stefański came from a lower-class family and was mostly self-educated. He taught himself French and Latin and learned German while working as an apprentice to a German owned printer. As a teenager he took part in the November Uprising in Congress Poland against Russian rule.

References
 Witold Jakóbczyk, Przetrwać na Wartą 1815-1914, Dzieje narodu i państwa polskiego, vol. III-55, Krajowa Agencja Wydawnicza, Warszawa 1989

1813 births
1877 deaths
People from Poznań County
People from the Grand Duchy of Posen
Polish politicians
November Uprising participants
Poles - political prisoners in the Prussian partition